This is a list of players who have scored a hat-trick (i.e. three or more goals in a single game) in the All-Ireland Senior Hurling Championship.
Key

† 1921 All-Ireland Senior Hurling Championship Final

References

Hats
Hat
All-Ireland